To make a pinky promise, or pinky swear, is a traditional gesture most commonly practiced amongst children involving the locking of the pinkies of two people to signify that a promise has been made. The gesture is taken to signify that the person can break the finger of the one who broke the promise. The tradition appears to be a relatively modern invention, possibly as a continuation of older finger traditions.

Prevalence worldwide 
In North America, it is most common amongst school-aged children or adults and close friends and has existed since at least 1860, when the Dictionary of Americanisms listed the following accompanying promise:

Pinky, pinky bow-bell,
Whoever tells a lie
Will sink down to the bad place
And never rise up again.

Pinky swearing has origins in Japan from 1600-1803, where it is called  and often additionally confirmed with the vow . 

Recently, in South Korea, the hooked pinky has been followed by a "seal", wherein the thumbs touch each other while the pinkies are still hooked.

In Taiwan, stamping after hooking pinkies has been common place for over 30 years. 

In Belfast, Northern Ireland it is referred to as a "piggy promise".

In Italy, a similar tradition is called "giurin giurello" or "giurin giuretto".
 
In Maharashtra (India), this concept similarly using Marathi calls this "Gatti fu".

There is also another pinky swear promise made between children in the Isle of Man. It goes: 
“Make friends, make friends,
Never ever break friends,
If you do,
You’ll catch the flu,
And that will be the end of you!”

References

External links
 

Oaths
Traditions
Hand gestures